The 2021–22 Women's England Hockey League season (sponsored by Vitality) is the 2021–22 season of England's field hockey league structure and England Hockey Women's Championship Cup. The 2021–22 season returned to normality following two seasons of disruption caused by the COVID-19 pandemic in the United Kingdom. The 2021–22 Premier Division saw the same teams competing from the following season, which had been cancelled. Therefore Surbiton were the defending champions, having won the league during the 2019–20 season.

The season started on 18 September 2021, with the Premier Division using a new system of two phases. The first phase would consist of 10 matches per club and would be completed by the end of 2021, determining the top six clubs (irrespective of home and away advantage) for phase 2. The other divisions would use the traditional format (home and away against each team).

The season ended without playoffs because of the new format and Surbiton effectively defended their title successfully because the previous season had been wiped out. It was Surbiton's eighth consecutive title.

Beeston finished fifth in the league standings but won the 2022 England Hockey Women's Championship Cup.

Final tables

Premier Division

Division One South

Division One North

England Hockey Women's Championship Cup

Quarter-finals

Semi-finals

Final 
Lee Valley Hockey and Tennis Centre

Beeston
Steph Tirrell (gk), Julie Whiting, Ella Cusack,  Alice Huddlestone, Lauren Burrell (capt), Hannah Grieve, Maddie Pendle, Charlotte Summers, Sophie Robinson, Lucy Millington, Paige Gillott; reps: Cerys Miller, Ruby Apoola, Beatrice Bell, Madeleine Newitt, Nadia Benallal; coach: James Sordillo; manager: Zoe Hainsworth.

Buckingham
Nicole Marks (gk), Megan Lewis-Williams, Emma O'Nien, Lottie Porter (capt), Maddy Newlyn, Lauren Thomas, Kirsty Freshwater, Natasha James, Tilly Crampsie, Rebecca van Arrowsmith, Olivia Strickland; reps: Georgina Black, Alex Naughalty, cassidy Jorritsma, Deborah James; manager: Kate Porter.

See also
2021–22 Men's England Hockey League season

References

2021-22
England
2021 in English sport
2022 in English sport